Stade Dr. Issoufou Joseph Conombo is a multi-use stadium in Ouagadougou, Burkina Faso. It is currently used mostly for football matches and is the home of Santos Football Club. The stadium holds 25,000 people.

References

Football venues in Burkina Faso
Buildings and structures in Ouagadougou